Free and Equal (Spanish: Libres e Iguales) is a Spanish civic organisation born as a reaction against Catalan nationalism. According to the movement, its aims are "defending democratic principles, mobilising Spanish society against Catalan independence, and delegitimising nationalism".

The organisation's name alludes to article 1 of the Declaration of the Rights of Man and of the Citizen ("Men are born and remain free and equal in rights. Social distinctions can be founded only on the common good.") as well as the first article of the Universal Declaration of Human Rights ("All human beings are born free and equal in dignity and rights. They are endowed with reason and conscience and should act towards one another in a spirit of brotherhood").

It was launched on the 15th July 2014 outside the Congreso de los Diputados with headline manifesto promises of "reclaiming the 1978 Spanish constitution", rejecting the "breakup" of the national sovereignty of Spanish people, and a search for a pact of major Spanish political parties against secessionism.

Following the 2015 local and regional elections, the group called for PP, PSOE, UPyD and C's to create a pact against populism, with the objective of "preventing populist contamination from lethally eroding the institutions and fundamental bases of Spanish democracy".

References 

2014 in Spain
Social movements
Social movements in Spain